Elsa Lila (born 15 June 1981) is an Albanian singer.

Life and career 

Elsa Lila was born on 15 June 1981 in Tirana, Albania. Her father was a singer of the former Albanian state choir, while her mother was a violinist, so both of her parents raised her close to the music and the theatre, giving her a great love for the arts. Lila had shown her singing and acting talents ever since she was a child in Albanian state television shows, and won the Albanian national song contest two years in a row while she was in her teenage years. She's also known for originating the role of Satine in the Albanian-language version of the musical Moulin Rouge. In 2014, Lila was a judge on the fourth season of The Voice of Albania. In March 16th 2022, she was arrested by Italian police, in Rome, suspected of criminal activities with narcotics.

In 1996, at the age of 15, Lila won the Albanian national song contest, and won the Albanian public award through televoting. In 1997 she repeated herself, and won the Albanian national song contest, and public award. In 1998, she was noticed by all of Europe when she won Albania the Varna international song contest in Bulgaria, where 14 other countries participated. In the same year she represented her country in Lisboa Expo 98, holding a concert. In 1999, at only 18 years old, Lila was elected "Albanian singer of the century" by the national poll of the Albanian state radio television. In the same year Lila won the first competition of Kenga Magjike. In 2001, she was awarded "Ambassador of the Albanian Music in the World" by Rexhep Mejdani, President of the Republic of Albania. She was recognised also all around Asia, and the United States when she modeled for various magazine covers in New York City, and sang at the Avery Fisher Hall to the American State Secretary, in 2005, and in China she sang the jingle of the popular Chinese television program, CCTV, while she was a guest there. In 2007, she took part at the 57th Sanremo Song Contest with the song "Il senso della vita" that precedes the album coming out at springtime. In December 2008, she was the host of 47th Festivali I Këngës in Tirana and she sang a song with Enrico Ruggeri, and it became part of the soundtrack of the movie by director Gjergj Xhuvani.

2022–present: Comeback and continued success 

She emerged victorious, but only managed to win the jury vote, and thus couldn't represent Albania in the Eurovision Song Contest 2023, as Albina & Familja Kelmendi won a separate public vote.

Discography

Albums

Singles

References 

1981 births
21st-century Albanian women singers
Albanian expatriates in Italy
Albanian-language singers
Festivali i Këngës winners
Kënga Magjike winners
Living people
Musicians from Tirana